The Distant Barking of Dogs is a 2017 documentary film produced by Monica Hellström, and directed by Simon Lereng Wilmont. The film, set in Hnutove near Mariupol, follows the life of 10-year-old Ukrainian boy Oleg throughout a year during the War in Donbass. Through Oleg's perspective, the film examines what it means to grow up in a war zone.

The film premiered at the 2017 International Documentary Festival Amsterdam, where it won the IDFA Competition for First Appearance.

Cast
 Oleg Afanasyev
 Alexandra Ryabichkina
 Jarik

Critical response 
On the review aggregator Rotten Tomatoes, the film holds an approval rating of 93% based on 14 reviews.

Awards
The Distant Barking of Dogs won a Peabody Award in the Documentary category. It was 1 of 15 films shortlisted for the 2019 91st Academy Awards in the Documentary Feature category. The documentary won the award of 2017 International Documentary Film Festival Amsterdam for Best First Appearance. It was also among five nominations for the best documentary at 2018 31st European Film Awards. In January 2019 The Distant Barking of Dogs won the prize of the Cinema Eye Honors.

References

External links
 Official site
 The Distant Barking of Dogs on Cineuropa
 
 

2017 films
2010s Russian-language films
2017 documentary films
Danish documentary films